= Biznes =

Newspaper in Albania

- Owner: Spekter
- Founded: 2003; 22 years ago
- Language: Albanian

Biznes is a newspaper published in Albania. The paper was launched in 2003. It is owned by the Spekter company.
